Arguis is a municipality located in the province of Huesca, Aragon, Spain. According to the 2004 census (INE), the municipality had a population of 61 inhabitants.

The Master of Arguis derives his name from a painting which once hung in the town church.

The municipality includes the village Bentué de Rasal.

References

Municipalities in the Province of Huesca